This Providence is the second studio album by the band This Providence, released on September 12, 2006, by Fueled by Ramen.

Track listing

Charts

References

2006 albums
This Providence albums
Fueled by Ramen albums